Juan José "Juanjo" García Granero (born 26 April 1981 in Madrid) is a Spanish footballer who plays mainly as a left midfielder.

External links

1981 births
Living people
Footballers from Madrid
Spanish footballers
Association football midfielders
La Liga players
Segunda División players
Segunda División B players
Tercera División players
Real Zaragoza B players
Real Zaragoza players
Elche CF players
Xerez CD footballers
UD Vecindario players
Universidad de Las Palmas CF footballers
CD Leganés players
CD Paracuellos Antamira players
Super League Greece players
Ionikos F.C. players
Spain youth international footballers
Spanish expatriate footballers
Expatriate footballers in Greece
Spanish expatriate sportspeople in Greece